The Shaldag-class patrol boat (Kingfisher) is a small but fast class of patrol boats developed for the Israeli Navy and launched in 1989, it has since seen service with several other navies. Designed for security tasks where high intercept speeds are required, such as interdiction of terrorism and illegal smuggling. Its salient features high speed in rough seas, with good seakeeping and outstanding maneuverability, exceptionally low slamming in all sea states, dry decks at all speeds and very spacious and accessible internal arrangement.

History
The Shaldag class was conceptualized by Israel Shipyards in response to request from the Israeli Navy for a fast patrol boat to protect Israeli waters from terrorist threats.

Design and construction

The hull, deck and deckhouse are of welded marine aluminium alloy, with transverse frames and longitudinals. Integral double bottom tanks contain fuel with an additional gravity fuel tank at the center. The hull is divided into six watertight compartments which meet strict international flooded damage stability criteria.

Armament
The vessels are armed with a Typhoon Weapon Station, mounting a Bushmaster M242 and electro-optics systems. They are equipped with foredeck and aftdeck rings for Oerlikon 20 mm cannon and a single gun mount. There are spigots for 0.5-inch machine guns on both sides of the main deck. The boat is able to accommodate most advanced new weapon systems, such as the rapid-fire stabilized gun mount, remotely controlled by a night vision system.

The Shaldag Mark II variants are equipped with Spike ER surface to surface missiles.

Operators

Military operators
 : Operated by Equatorial Guinean Navy.
 : Operated by Israeli Navy.
 : Operated by the Nigerian Navy.
 : Nine units of Shaldag Mk V were ordered in a contract signed on February 9, 2021 under the Navy's Fast Attack Interdictor Craft-Missile (FAIC-M) Acquisition Project. Two of them are expected in September 2022.
 : Purchased for the Senegalese Navy.
 : 7 Used by the Sri Lankan Navy.

Law enforcement agencies
 : Used by Argentine Naval Prefecture. 4 Shaldag Mk IIs.
: Purchased for the State Border Service (Azerbaijan).
 : Used by Cyprus Port and Marine Police.
 : Three Shaldag Mk IVs with Romanian Border Police.

Potential civilian operators
 : The Philippine Coast Guard has considered the use of the Shaldag Mk II.

Subclasses

References

Patrol boat classes
Naval ships of Israel